The Journal of Cosmology describes itself as a peer-reviewed open access scientific journal of cosmology, although the quality of the process has been questioned. The journal has been closely related historically with a similar online website, Cosmology (or Cosmology.com) and Journal of Astrobiology and Space Science Reviews., as all three were founded by neuroscientist Rhawn Gabriel Joseph. Rhawn Joseph established the journal in 2009, published by Cosmology Science Publishers, and it was sold to Modern Cosmology Associates in 2011.  Rudolph Schild is the editor-in-chief.

As of October 2021, the original domain is now "astrology & spirituality website" based in the Netherlands. The mirror remains online, though it only has Rhawn Joseph's original 14 volumes in common with the full Journal of Cosmology. On 1 November 2021, the original Journal of Cosmology was fully restored at the new domain address "thejournalofcosmology.com" and is fully active again.

Scope
The Journal of Cosmology is an online publication website. The journal publishes original hypotheses and discoveries in cosmology, astronomy, astrobiology, and Earth and planetary sciences. Contributions may cover multiple disciplines and sub-disciplines of biology, geology, physics, chemistry, extinction, the origin and evolution of life, panspermia and Martian colonization and exploration.

In general, published papers present original hypotheses, reviews, commentary, and speculation. Also covered is analysis of similarities and differences between competing hypotheses (Big Bang vs Steady State theory, panspermia vs abiogenesis, etc.).

In June 2013, the journal launched a public invitation for theologians, theological ethicists and philosophers to contribute articles on "astro-theology".

Reliability
The quality of peer review at the journal has been questioned. 
It has been called a predatory journal by Jeffrey Beall.
The journal promotes fringe viewpoints and speculative viewpoints on astrobiology, astrophysics, and quantum physics. Skeptical blogger and biologist PZ Myers said of the journal "... it isn't a real science journal at all, but is the... website of a small group... obsessed with the idea of Hoyle and Wickramasinghe that life originated in outer space and simply rained down on Earth."
The journal has responded that the paradigm "life on Earth came from Earth" is like a religious belief.

History

Disputes with other scientists
Scientists who have posted accounts of personal attacks by the journal's staff members include Susan Blackmore, David Brin, and PZ Myers.

Hoover paper
In early March 2011, the journal drew widespread controversy for the publication of a paper by Richard B. Hoover a retired NASA scientist, with claims of evidence in meteorites that life on Earth could have come from space, in this case debris carrying life from a comet to Earth. The journal dismissed the criticism as "a barrage of slanderous attacks" from "crackpots and charlatans", calling their own journal courageous for resisting the "terrorists" whose actions they equated with the Inquisition. NASA distanced itself from Hoover's findings, and issued a statement saying that the paper had been previously submitted in 2007 to International Journal of Astrobiology which did not accept it for review.
A number of commentaries on the paper were also published.

In an open letter to the editors of Science and Nature, Rudolph Schild proposed to establish a commission to investigate the validity of the Hoover paper, which would be led by three experts appointed by Journal of Cosmology, Science and Nature. Schild said he would interpret "any refusal to cooperate, no matter what the excuse" from Nature or Science as "vindication for the Journal of Cosmology and the Hoover paper, and an acknowledgment that the editorial policies of the Journal of Cosmology are beyond reproach". They subsequently issued another statement in which they stood by their publication process and suggested that criticisms were "slander and histrionic tirades", and comparing their critics to "lunatics... unleashed to throw filth", suggesting that their own actions were part of a 2000-year struggle of science against religion. Since their critics had "refused to cooperate" in a review, they reaffirmed the study to be "beyond reproach".

The James Randi Educational Foundation awarded Hoover the tongue-in-cheek Pigasus Award, for repeatedly announcing, "[a]long with the crackpot Journal of Cosmology", widely dismissed claims that he had found signs of life in Mars rocks.

NASA lawsuit

On 17 January 2014, NASA reported that a martian rock, named "Pinnacle Island", that was not in an Opportunity rover image taken on Sol 3528, "mysteriously" appeared 13 days later in a similar image taken on Sol 3540. One possible explanation, presented by Steven Squyres, principal investigator of the Mars Exploration Rover Mission, was that the rover, in one of its turning motions, flicked the rock from a few feet away and into the new location. In response to the finding, Rhawn Joseph published an article in the Journal of Cosmology on 17 January 2014, concluding that the object is in fact a living organism resembling apothecia. Rhawn Joseph then filed a writ of mandamus on 27 January 2014 in San Francisco Federal Court, demanding that NASA examine the rock more closely. NASA already had examined the rock on 8 January 2014 and confirmed it was a rock with a high sulphur, manganese, and magnesium content. According to Squyres, "We have looked at it with our microscope. It is clearly a rock." On 14 February 2014, NASA released an image showing the location from where the "Pinnacle Island" rock was dislodged by the Opportunity rover.

Abstracting and indexing
The Journal of Cosmology is abstracted and indexed in Polymer Library and ProQuest databases. From 2009 until 2011 it was indexed in the Astrophysics Data System.

References

Further reading

External links
  - May 2021 archived version

Astronomy journals
Fringe science journals
Publications established in 2009
Open access journals
English-language journals
Astronomical controversies